Clubul Sportiv Rapid București is a Romanian multi-sport club based in Bucharest, Romania.

History 
The club was founded as Asociația Culturală și Sportivă CFR in 1923.

Men's Football section

Domestic 
Liga I
Winners (3): 1966–67, 1998–99, 2002–03
Runners-up (14): 1936–37, 1937–38, 1939–40, 1940–41, 1948–49, 1950, 1963–64, 1964–65, 1965–66, 1969–70, 1970–71, 1997–98, 1999–00, 2005–06
Cupa României
Winners (13): 1934–35, 1936–37, 1937–38, 1938–39, 1939–40, 1940–41, 1941–42, 1971–72, 1974–75, 1997–98, 2001–02, 2005–06, 2006–07
Runners-up (6): 1960–61, 1961–62, 1967–68, 1994–95, 1998–99, 2011–12
Supercupa României
Winners (4): 1999, 2002, 2003, 2007
Runners-up (2): 1998, 2006

International 
Balkans Cup
Winners (2): 1964, 1966

Women's Handball section

Domestic 
Liga Națională 
Winners (5): 1960–61, 1961–62, 1962–63, 1966–67, 2002–03, 2021-22
Runners-up (5): 1963–64, 1965–66, 1992–93, 1994–95, 2004–05
National Cup
Winners (1): 2003–04
Runners-up (2): 1991–92, 1993–94

International 
EHF European Champions Cup:
Winners (1): 1963–64
EHF Cup:
Winners (1): 1992–93
EHF Challenge Cup:
Winners (1): 1999–00

Men's Volleyball section

Domestic 
Divizia A1
Winners (11): 1948–49, 1949–50, 1954–55, 1955–56, 1958–59, 1959–60, 1960–61, 1961–62, 1962–63, 1964–65, 1965–66

International 
CEV Champions League:
Winners (3): 1960–61, 1962–63, 1964–65
Runners-up (4): 1959–60, 1961–62, 1965–66, 1966–67

Women's Volleyball section

Domestic 
Divizia A1:
Winners (19): 1949–50, 1958–59, 1964–65, 1967–68, 1971–72, 1972–73, 1973–74, 1991–92, 1992–93, 1993–94, 1994–95, 1995–96, 1996–97, 1998–99, 1999–00, 2000–01, 2001–02, 2003–04, 2005–06

International 
CEF Challenge Cup
Third-place (1): 1989–90

Men's Water polo section

Domestic 
Romanian Superliga
Winners (13): 1933–34, 1934–35, 1939–40, 1942–43, 1971–72, 1974–75, 1975–76, 1976–77, 1980–81, 2000–01, 2001–02, 2002–03, 2003–04

Women's Basketball section

Domestic 
Divizia A
Winners (9): 1950–51, 1951–52, 1959–60, 1960–61, 1961–62, 1964–65, 1968–69, 1971–72, 1977–78
Cupa României
Winners (2): 1968–69, 1994–95

Men's Basketball section

Domestic 
Liga Națională
Winners (1): 1951

References

External links 
  

 
Sports clubs established in 1923
Rapid Bucuresti